Jeon Ji-yoon (born October 15, 1990), professionally known as Jiyoon or Jenyer, is a South Korean singer, rapper, songwriter and actress known for her work as a former member of South Korean girl group 4Minute. She debuted as a solo artist on November 2, 2016, under the stage name Jenyer, with the release of her debut digital single, "I Do".

Early life 
Jeon Ji-yoon was born on October 15, 1990 in Suwon, South Korea.

Career

2009–2012: 4Minute and solo activities 

Jiyoon was chosen as a member of 4Minute in 2009. The five-member girl group officially debuted on June 18, 2009 with their debut single "Hot Issue" on M! Countdown.

On October 15, 2009, she was a featured artist in Woo Yi-kyung's album Look at Me with the song "Look at Me". On April 13, 2010, she was a featured artist in Lee Hyo-ri's fourth album H-Logic with the song "Bring It Back" together with After School's Bekah. She sang in the soundtrack of MBC's My Princess, with the song "Oasis", released on February 7, 2011. She was also featured in Hyuna's album Bubble Pop! in the song "Downtown". The album was released on July 5, 2011.

Ji-yoon joined KBS's Immortal Songs 2 in June 2011 as a replacement of Song Ji Eun of Secret due to their Japanese promotions. "I felt that her vocals were more charming than [4Minute's] main vocalist Gayoon," the producer of the show said. On the show, professionals sing competitively and are judged by a studio audience of 200. She sang "We Meet Again" in an episode broadcast on July 15. And joining on KBS's Immortal Songs 2, she won together with DJ Koo with the song "I (Nan)" originally by Clon against Super Junior's Kyuhyun and Son Ho-young.

2013–2016: 2Yoon and 4Minute's disbandment 

Jiyoon and her bandmate Gayoon had formed a subgroup called 2Yoon in 2013. They released their debut EP "Harvest Moon" with lead single "24/7" on 17 January 2013. The sub-group officially debuted on January 17 on M Countdown. In September 2014, it was revealed that Ji-yoon will making her acting debut with the web drama Dreaming CEO.

On September 24, 2015, it was revealed that Jiyoon will join Unpretty Rapstar Season 2. During Unpretty Rapstar, Jiyoon released a solo song featuring Jung Il-hoon called "This Ain’t Me" during the semifinals. On 13 June 2016, Cube Entertainment announced that 4Minute decided to disband and the members, excluding HyunA, were still in discussion on whether they will renew their contracts. On 15 June 2016, Cube Entertainment official announced that Jihyun, Gayoon, Jiyoon and Sohyun's contracts had expired and they decided not to renew their contracts.

2016–present: Label change and Day and Night 
On August 8, 2016, Jiyoon has signed an exclusive contract with JS E&M, which also houses artists such as actors Seo Ha-joon, Byun Jung-soo, Yang Mi-ra and Chun Jung-myung, as well as South Korean girl group Tren-D. The agency announced her solo debut plans and actively support her from music to acting and also on variety shows, citing her as having "unlimited potential". On August 31, 2016, Jiyoon is reported hard at work preparing for a digital single album release in October. Despite being a singer, her new agency confirmed she will also be active in upcoming dramas and broadcasts.

Jiyoon debuted as a solo artist on November 2, 2016 by the stage name "Jenyer", with the single album Day and Night. The title song "I Do" and its music video were released on the same day. Jiyoon didn't promote her new single on music shows. On March 23, 2017, she released the collaboration single "Cliché" with Samuel Seo. The accompanying music video was released the same day. On April 10, 2017, Jiyoon showed support and attended the movie premiere for "Daddy You, Daughter Me" in which Heo Gayoon, the former groupmate of Jiyoon, made her acting debut.

Since 2019 she's also the vocalist of the band PRSNT with DJ Allzwell and producer mOnSteR nO.9.

Personal life 
She graduated from Byeongjeom High School and is currently attending Kyung Hee University, majoring in Post Modern Music.

Discography

Extended plays

Single albums

Singles

Soundtrack appearances

Other appearances

Filmography

Film

Television series

Television shows

Musical theatre

References

External links 
 JS E&M Profile

1990 births
Living people
4Minute members
Cube Entertainment artists
Japanese-language singers of South Korea
South Korean female idols
South Korean women pop singers
South Korean women rappers
South Korean television personalities
South Korean female models
Kyung Hee University alumni
Unpretty Rapstar contestants
21st-century South Korean singers
21st-century South Korean women singers
People from Suwon